HD 112028 is an evolved star in the northern constellation of Camelopardalis.  It has spectral peculiarities that have been interpreted as a shell, and also relatively weak magnesium and silicon lines.  Its spectral class has been variously assigned between B9 and A2, and its luminosity class between a subgiant and bright giant.

At an angular separation of 21.47″ is the slightly fainter spectroscopic binary HD 112014, consisting of a pair of A-type main sequence stars.  HD 112028 and HD 112014 together are known as the binary star Struve 1694.

References

External links
 HR 4893
 CCDM J12492+8325
 Image HD 112028

Camelopardalis (constellation)
112028
062572
A-type giants
4893
Durchmusterung objects